Vanduser is a village in Scott County, Missouri, United States. The population was 267 at the 2010 census.  The zip code is 63784.

History
Vanduser was laid out in 1895 when the railroad was extended to that point. A post office called Vanduser has been in operation since 1898. The community has the name of John Vanduser, the original owner of the town site. 
Vanduser is also the home of the infamous Mike Foster, world renowned street racer and driver of a 1981 El Camino called "The Trap Queen".

Geography
Vanduser is located at  (36.991280, -89.686544).

Demographics

2010 census
As of the census of 2010, there were 267 people, 94 households, and 59 families living in the village. The racial makeup of the village was 91.01% White, 3.00% Black or African American, 0.37% Native American, 2.25% from other races, and 3.37% from two or more races. Hispanic or Latino of any race were 3.37% of the population.

There were 94 households, of which 34.0% had children under the age of 18 living with them, 35.1% were married couples living together, 22.3% had a female householder with no husband present, 5.3% had a male householder with no wife present, and 37.2% were non-families. 28.7% of all households were made up of individuals, and 16% had someone living alone who was 65 years of age or older. The average household size was 2.54 and the average family size was 3.03.

The median age in the village was 37.1 years. 33% of residents were under the age of 18; 7.9% were between the ages of 18 and 24; 18.3% were from 25 to 44; 25.8% were from 45 to 64; and 15% were 65 years of age or older. The gender makeup of the village was 53.6% male and 46.4% female.

2000 census
As of the census of 2000, there were 217 people, 84 households, and 58 families living in the village. The population density was 1,643.0 people per square mile (644.5/km). There were 92 housing units at an average density of 696.6 per square mile (273.2/km). The racial makeup of the village was 99.54% White and 0.46% African American. Hispanic or Latino of any race were 0.92% of the population.

There were 84 households, out of which 35.7% had children under the age of 18 living with them, 48.8% were married couples living together, 15.5% had a female householder with no husband present, and 29.8% were non-families. 27.4% of all households were made up of individuals, and 15.5% had someone living alone who was 65 years of age or older. The average household size was 2.58 and the average family size was 3.15.

In the village, the population was spread out, with 23.5% under the age of 18, 9.7% from 18 to 24, 29.0% from 25 to 44, 24.0% from 45 to 64, and 13.8% who were 65 years of age or older. The median age was 38 years. For every 100 females, there were 88.7 males. For every 100 females age 18 and over, there were 82.4 males.

The median income for a household in the village was $25,417, and the median income for a family was $27,292. Males had a median income of $23,750 versus $14,531 for females. The per capita income for the village was $10,351. About 14.5% of families and 18.0% of the population were below the poverty line, including 18.2% of those under the age of eighteen and 32.3% of those 65 or over.

References

Villages in Scott County, Missouri
Villages in Missouri